We Broke Up is a 2021 American comedy film directed by Jeff Rosenberg and starring Aya Cash and William Jackson Harper.

Plot 
Lori and Doug decide to end their long relationship. However, life gives them a second chance when they are invited to Lori's younger sibling's wedding ceremony as a couple. Will they be able to save their relationship or end it forever?

Cast
Aya Cash as Lori
William Jackson Harper as Doug
Sarah Bolger as Bea
Tony Cavalero as Jayson
Peri Gilpin as Adelaide
Kobi Libii as Ari
Azita Ghanizada as Roya
Zak Steiner as Eric
Eduardo Franco as Mike 
Larisa Oleynik as Tia
Emily Pendergast as Allison
 Eric Martig as Dominic
 Brenda Ballard as Helen
 Gary Ballard as Herb
 Pedro Lopez as Salvatore
 Lee Chen as May
 Alex Rich as Paul
 Tom Zawacki as Chaz

Release
The film was released in theaters and on demand April 23, 2021.

Reception
On review aggregator website Rotten Tomatoes, the film holds an approval rating of 67% based on 24 reviews, with an average rating of 6/10. The website's critics consensus reads: "Despite not living up to the potential of its premise, We Broke Up more than makes up for it thanks largely to Aya Cash and William Jackson Harper's relatable performances." On Metacritic, the film has a weighted average score of 55 out of 100, based on 6 critics, indicating "mixed or average reviews".

References

External links
 

American comedy films
Vertical Entertainment films
2021 comedy films
2020s English-language films
2020s American films